Agricultural Development Bank refers to a number of different institutions, including:
 Agricultural Development Bank of Pakistan, also known as Zarai Taraqiati Bank
 Agricultural Development Bank of Trinidad and Tobago
 Agricultural Development Bank of Ghana
 Agricultural Development Bank of Nepal